Bertram Nathanial Bowery (born 29 October 1954) is an English former professional footballer who played in England and the United States as a striker.

Early and personal life
Bowery was born in Saint Kitts and Nevis, and grew up in England. His son Jordan is also a professional footballer.

Career

Bowery began his career in non-league football with Ilkeston Town and Worksop Town, before starting a professional career with Nottingham Forest where he became the first signing of Brian Clough, agreeing a two-and-a-half-year contract for a fee of £2000. He played for Forest between 1975 and 1976, and made two league appearances, scoring two goals. While at Forest, he spent a loan spell with Lincoln City in 1976, where he made four league appearances and scored one goal. Bowery later played in the NASL for the Boston Minutemen and Team Hawaii, before returning to England to play non-league football with Long Eaton United and Arnold.

References

1954 births
Living people
English footballers
Ilkeston Town F.C. (1945) players
Worksop Town F.C. players
Nottingham Forest F.C. players
Lincoln City F.C. players
Boston Minutemen players
Team Hawaii players
Long Eaton United F.C. players
Arnold F.C. players
English Football League players
North American Soccer League (1968–1984) players
English expatriate footballers
English expatriate sportspeople in the United States
Expatriate soccer players in the United States
Association football forwards
Saint Kitts and Nevis emigrants to the United Kingdom